Edward Cory Kunz (born April 8, 1986) is an American former professional baseball pitcher. He played in Major League Baseball (MLB) for the New York Mets.

Early life and amateur career
Kunz was born in Portland, Oregon. He attended Parkrose High School, where he played football, basketball, and baseball. In 2006, he played collegiate summer baseball with the Falmouth Commodores of the Cape Cod Baseball League and was named a league all-star.

Professional career

New York Mets
On August 24, the New York Mets signed Kunz after they selected him 42nd overall in the 2007 Major League Baseball Draft.  Less than a year later, on August 3, he was called up to the Major Leagues from the Double-A affiliate, Binghamton Mets, after having a 2.79 ERA with 27 saves in 44 games.

That day, in his Major League debut, he pitched a scoreless seventh inning. However, two weeks later, after struggling and the Mets' trade for Luis Ayala, he was demoted back to the minors.

On November 5, 2010, Kunz was sent down to the minors to Triple-A Buffalo along with Jesús Feliciano and Raul Valdes. Along with them were Mike Hessman and Omir Santos who then became free-agents after refusing their minor league assignment.

San Diego Padres
On March 29, 2011, Kunz was traded by the Mets to the Padres at the end of spring training for minor league first baseman Allan Dykstra.

On March 20, 2013, Kunz was released by the Padres.

References

External links

Living people
1986 births
New York Mets players
Baseball players from Portland, Oregon
Oregon State Beavers baseball players
Major League Baseball pitchers
Brooklyn Cyclones players
Binghamton Mets players
New Orleans Zephyrs players
Buffalo Bisons (minor league) players
San Antonio Missions players
Tucson Padres players
Parkrose High School alumni
Falmouth Commodores players